Grace Balsdon  (born 13 April 1993) is an English field hockey player who plays as a defender for Hampstead & Westminster and the England and Great Britain national teams.

Club career

She plays club hockey in the Women's England Hockey League Premier Division for Hampstead & Westminster. She has also played for Canterbury.

International career

In 2016, Balsdon played defender for the University of Maryland field hockey team and was named the Big Ten Defensive Player of the Year, National Field Hockey Coaches Association All-American, All-Big Ten First Team, and three-time Big Ten Defensive Player of the Week.

In the 2020 Tokyo Summer Olympics, Balsdon scored the game winning goal for Great Britain to win the bronze medal in women's field hockey.

References

External links
 
 
 

1993 births
Living people
English female field hockey players
Commonwealth Games medallists in field hockey
Commonwealth Games bronze medallists for England
Female field hockey defenders
Sportspeople from Canterbury
Women's England Hockey League players
Maryland Terrapins field hockey players
English expatriate sportspeople in the United States
Field hockey players at the 2018 Commonwealth Games
Hampstead & Westminster Hockey Club players
Field hockey players at the 2020 Summer Olympics
Olympic field hockey players of Great Britain
Olympic bronze medallists for Great Britain
Medalists at the 2020 Summer Olympics
Olympic medalists in field hockey
English Olympic medallists
Medallists at the 2018 Commonwealth Games